Caribou River   is a community in the Canadian province of Nova Scotia, located in  Pictou County.

References

Communities in Pictou County